Raising Dad is an American television sitcom that aired on The WB from October 5, 2001, to May 10, 2002. The series stars Bob Saget, Kat Dennings, Brie Larson, Riley Smith, Beau Wirick and Jerry Adler, and was produced by Albion Productions in association with Paramount Television.

Premise
Matt Stewart (Saget) is a widower trying to raise his two daughters, Sarah (Dennings) and Emily (Larson), with the help of his live-in father, Sam (Jerry Adler), a former baseball player for the Boston Red Sox. Further complicating matters, Matt works as an English teacher at Sarah's high school. Matt struggles to keep his nose out of his daughter's social life while attempting to find his own.

Cast

Main
 Bob Saget as Matt Stewart
 Kat Dennings as Sarah Stewart
 Brie Larson as Emily Stewart
 Meagan Good as Katie
 Andy Kindler as Mr. Travers
 Jerry Adler as Sam Stewart
 Ben Indra as Josh (from episode 12; recurring previously)

Recurring
 Fred Stoller as Bert
 Riley Smith as Jared Ashby
 Beau Wirick as Evan
 Camille Guaty as Olivia
 Tembi Locke as Vice Principal Liz Taylor

Episodes

Reception
Carole Horst of Variety reviewed the first episode of Raising Dad and wrote: "a family trying to cope with the death of the mother... isn’t funny, but it is touching at times", and added that the cast "is fine, and "Dad" shows some promise. It probably will keep Rebas audience tuned in to end a nice family night of TV."

References

External links
 

2000s American sitcoms
2001 American television series debuts
2002 American television series endings
English-language television shows
Television series about families
Television series by CBS Studios
Television shows filmed in Massachusetts
Television shows filmed in Los Angeles
Television shows set in Massachusetts
The WB original programming